Switzerland competed at the 1994 Winter Olympics in Lillehammer, Norway.

Medalists

Alpine skiing

Men

Men's combined

Women

Women's combined

Biathlon

Men

 1 A penalty loop of 150 metres had to be skied per missed target.
 2 One minute added per missed target.

Bobsleigh

Cross-country skiing

Men

 1 Starting delay based on 10 km results. 
 C = Classical style, F = Freestyle

Men's 4 × 10 km relay

Women

 2 Starting delay based on 5 km results. 
 C = Classical style, F = Freestyle

Women's 4 × 5 km relay

Figure skating

Women

Freestyle skiing

Men

Women

Luge

Men

Nordic combined 

Men's individual

Events:
 normal hill ski jumping
 15 km cross-country skiing 

Men's Team

Three participants per team.

Events:
 normal hill ski jumping
 10 km cross-country skiing

Ski jumping

Speed skating

Men

References
Official Olympic Reports
International Olympic Committee results database
 Olympic Winter Games 1994, full results by sports-reference.com

Nations at the 1994 Winter Olympics
1994
1994 in Swiss sport